= Gardener's Clay Formation =

The Gardener's Clay Formation is a Pleistocene geologic unit straddling the New York-New Jersey border. Fossil fish vertebrae and teeth are preserved in its sediments.
